Brian Scott Holman (born January 25, 1965) is a former Major League Baseball pitcher.

Holman's brother Brad Holman and stepfather Dick LeMay also were Major League pitchers.

Amateur career
Holman started his high school baseball career at Aurora Hinkley High School in Aurora, Colorado. He earned “All Centennial League” First Team Pitcher honors and was selected to the Colorado Division AAA “All State” High School Baseball Team.

In 1982, Holman moved to Wichita, Kansas, and attended Wichita North High School, where, as a senior, he made the All-State team.  After graduating from North High where he earned “All City”, “All District-5” and First Team High School “All American” honors, Holman was selected by the Montreal Expos in the first round of the June 1983 amateur draft/free agent draft.  He was the sixteenth player selected overall.  Holman decided to forgo a college baseball scholarship to the University of Nebraska in Lincoln to pursue a professional baseball career and signed with the Expos organization.

In 1989, Holman was included in a trade on May 25 to the Seattle Mariners along with Randy Johnson and Gene Harris for Mark Langston and a player to be named later (Mike Campbell).

Career
While in the Montreal minor league system, Holman earned the Expos' organizational “Player of the Month” three times.  He was named to the Double-A and Triple-A “All Star” teams, selected to the Topps Double-A “All Star” Team for all of Double–A baseball and was named The Sporting News Southern League Pitcher of the Year.

Holman made his major league debut with Montreal on June 25, 1988, vs. Barry Bonds and the Pittsburgh Pirates. Five days later on June 30, he recorded his first win with a five-hit complete game shutout vs. Tom Glavine and the Atlanta Braves.

On April 9, 1990, Holman was the Mariners “Opening Night” starting pitcher vs. the California Angels and recorded the victory with a 7–4 win. Eleven days later on April 20 at Oakland, he retired the first 26 batters he faced; Ken Phelps' home run over the head of Henry Cotto in right field and turned his near-perfect game into the fourth one-hitter in Mariners history.

During the late 1980s and early 1990s, Holman logged 32 wins and fourteen complete games, five of those shutouts in two and a half seasons of work.  His playing career was cut short by an arm injury.

Retirement
Holman focuses a majority of his time conducting private and group pitching lessons for both amateur and professional players. He is a coach at Texas Edge North Baseball Academy in Fort Worth, Texas. He is also a player adviser/representative for Baseball Management Services. Holman is a motivational speaker. Prior to transitioning back into baseball, Holman was a Managing Director and Principal for Ronald Blue & Co.’s in Kansas City, Kansas.  Holman joined Ronald Blue & Co., a national financial, estate, tax, and investment consulting firm.

In 2007, Holman was inducted into the "Kansas Baseball Hall of Fame" along with Joe Carter, Bill James and Phil Stephenson.

References

External links

1965 births
Living people
American expatriate baseball players in Canada
Baseball players from Denver
Gastonia Expos players
Indianapolis Indians players
Jacksonville Expos players
Jamestown Expos players
Major League Baseball pitchers
Montreal Expos players
Seattle Mariners players
West Palm Beach Expos players